Edwin J. Vandenberg (September 13, 1918 – 2005) was a chemist at Hercules Inc. and a researcher at Arizona State University.

Vandenberg is best known for his work at Hercules in the 1950s through the 1970s that included the independent discovery of isotactic polypropylene and the development of Ziegler-type catalysts.

The Vandenberg catalyst is named after him.  This catalyst is an aluminoxane, prepared from an alkyl-aluminium and water, used as a catalyst in the manufacture of polyether elastomers.

Awards
 ACS Award in Polymer Chemistry (1981)
 ACS Award in Applied Polymer Science (1991)
 ACS Rubber Division's Charles Goodyear Medal (1991)
 ACS Polymer Division's Herman F. Mark Award (1992)
 Society of Plastics Engineers International Award (1994)
 Priestley Medal (2003)

References

20th-century American chemists
1918 births
2005 deaths
Polymer scientists and engineers
Arizona State University faculty